Batman 1 may refer to:

Batman (1989 film), the 1989 film Batman
Batman Begins, the first installment of The Dark Knight trilogy
Bruce Wayne's Batman, the first iteration of DC Comics' "Batman"